Choanomphalus is a genus of air-breathing freshwater snails, aquatic pulmonate gastropod mollusks in the family Planorbidae, the ram's horn snails, or planorbids. All species in this genus have sinistral or left-coiling shells.

Species
Species within the genus Choanomphalus include:
 Choanomphalus amauronius Bourguignat, 1860
 Choanomphalus amauronius angulatus (B. Dybowski & Grochmalicki, 1925)
 Choanomphalus amauronius westerlundianus Lindholm, 1909
 Choanomphalus annuliformis Kozhov, 1936
 Choanomphalus anomphalus W. Dybowski, 1901
 Choanomphalus aorus Bourguignat, 1860
 Choanomphalus baicalensis
 Choanomphalus bathybius Beckman & Starobogatov, 1975
 Choanomphalus bathybius meridianus Beckman & Starobogatov, 1975
 Choanomphalus cryptomphalus W. Dybowski, 1901
 Choanomphalus eurystomus Lindholm, 1909
 Choanomphalus gerstfeldtianus Lindholm, 1909
 Choanomphalus grachevi Sitnikova & Röpstorf, 1999
 Choanomphalus huzhirensis Beckman & Starobogatov, 1975
 Choanomphalus hyaliniiformis Moskvicheva & Dworiadkin, 1980
 Choanomphalus incertus Lindholm, 1909
 Choanomphalus incertus mesospiralis B. Dybowski & Grochmalicki, 1925
 Choanomphalus korotnevi Lindholm, 1909
 Choanomphalus kozhovi Beckman & Starobogatov, 1975
 Choanomphalus lindholmi Beckman & Starobogatov, 1975
 Choanomphalus maacki Gerstfeldt, 1859 - type species
 Choanomphalus maacki andrussowianus (Lindholm, 1909)
 Choanomphalus maacki elatior Lindholm, 1909
 Choanomphalus microtrochus Lindholm, 1909
 Choanomphalus mongolicus
 Choanomphalus okhoticus Prozorova & Starobogatov, 1997
 Choanomphalus omphalotus W. Dybowski, 1901
 Choanomphalus parvus Kozhov, 1936
 Choanomphalus patulaeformis Lindholm, 1909
 Choanomphalus planorbiformis Beckman & Starobogatov, 1975
 Choanomphalus pygmaeus Lindholm, 1909
 Choanomphalus schrencki or Choanomphalus schrenkii W. Dybowski, 1875
 Choanomphalus valvatoides W. Dybowski, 1875

Synonyms:
 Choanomphalus riparius (Westerlund, 1865) is a synonym of Gyraulus riparius
 Choanomphalus rossmaessleri (Auerswald in A. Schmidt, 1851) is a synonym of Gyraulus rossmaessleri

References

External links 

Planorbidae